The following outline is provided as an overview of and topical guide to Henry Ford:

Henry Ford – American captain of industry and a business magnate, the founder of the Ford Motor Company, and the sponsor of the development of the assembly line technique of mass production.

Family of Henry Ford 
 William Ford
 Edsel Ford
 Henry Ford II

Companies of Henry Ford 

 Cadillac Automobile Company
 Detroit Automobile Company
 Ford Motor Company
 Kingsford Company
 Stout Metal Airplane Division of the Ford Motor Company
 Universal Credit Corporation

Inventions and designs of Henry Ford 

 Ford Model T
 Ford Model A
 Ford Trimotor
 Ford Quadricycle

Influence and ideas of Henry Ford 

 Assembly line
 Fordism
 History of the automobile

The Dearborn Independent 

 The Dearborn Independent
 The Protocols of the Elders of Zion
 The International Jew

Legacy 

 Fair Lane
 Ford Foundation
 The Henry Ford
 Car Entrepreneur of the Century

Miscellany 

 The American Axis: Henry Ford, Charles Lindbergh and the Rise of the Third Reich

External links 

Ford, Henry